The Andelle is a river of Normandy, France,  in length, flowing through the departments of Seine-Maritime and Eure. It is a right tributary of the Seine.

Geography 
The Andelle has its source in the Pays de Bray in the territory of the commune of Serqueux. Taking a southward journey, it flows through two French départements:
In Seine-Maritime : Forges-les-Eaux, Rouvray-Catillon, Sigy-en-Bray, Nolléval, Morville-sur-Andelle, Le Héron, Elbeuf-sur-Andelle and Croisy-sur-Andelle.
In the Eure : Vascœuil, Perruel, Perriers-sur-Andelle, Charleval, Fleury-sur-Andelle, Radepont, Douville-sur-Andelle, Pont-Saint-Pierre, Romilly-sur-Andelle and Pîtres where it joins the Seine on its right bank.
The average flow of the Andelle at Pitres, where it joins the Seine, is 7.2 m³ / second.

See also 
French water management scheme

Bibliography 
Albert Hennetier, Aux sources normandes: Promenade au fil des rivières en Seine-Maritime, Ed. Bertout, Luneray, 2006

References

Rivers of France
Rivers of Normandy
Rivers of Seine-Maritime
Rivers of Eure